Riders of the Apocalypse is the only album of musical side project of Therion band members called Demonoid.

Track listing
 "Wargods" – 5:50
 "Firestorms" – 3:30
 "Witchburners" – 4:31
 "14.th Century Plague" – 3:23
 "Hunger My Consort" – 5:01
 "The Evocation" – 5:13
 "Arrival of the Horsemen" – 6:17
 "End of our Times" – 4:01
 "Death" – 9:18

Credits
 Kristian Niemann - guitar
 Johan Niemann - bass guitar
 Christofer Johnsson - vocals
 Richard Evensand - drums

Guest musicians
Gesa Hangen - Cello (also in Therion)

External links
 
 Riders of the Apocalypse at Encyclopaedia Metallum
 

Demonoid (band) albums
2004 debut albums
Nuclear Blast albums